Wryde railway station was a station serving Wryde, Cambridgeshire on the Midland and Great Northern Joint Railway between Wisbech and Peterborough. Originally built by the Peterborough, Wisbech and Sutton Bridge Railway, it was opened for goods traffic on 1 June 1866 and for passengers on 1 August of the same year.

There was no passing loop at this station until 1906 when one was installed as part of the general upgrading of the line made to improve the King's Cross, Peterborough, Sheringham and Cromer services run in collaboration with the Great Northern Railway.

Passenger services were withdrawn on 2 December 1957, but goods trains travelling between Murrow and the brickworks at Dogsthorpe, near Peterborough, continued to pass through the station until 31 October 1965.

References

 The Midland & Great Northern Joint Railway by A.J. Wrottesley. Published by David & Charles. Newton Abbot 1970

External links
 Wryde station on navigable 1946 O. S. map

Disused railway stations in Cambridgeshire
Former Midland and Great Northern Joint Railway stations
Railway stations in Great Britain opened in 1866
Railway stations in Great Britain closed in 1957
1866 establishments in England
1957 disestablishments in England